There are three development zones in Shenyang, China.

Shenyang Finance and Trade Development Zone
The Shenyang Finance and Trade Development Zone was founded in 1992, and is the only other finance and trade-specific special development zone in China apart from the Lujiazui Finance & Trade Zone in Shanghai.

The current plan is to construct over 100 high-end commercial buildings, with 17 above , 5 above  and 2 above  in height. The Shenyang International Finance Center in particular, which broke ground in 2008, if ever completed would become China's tallest skyscraper north of the Yangtze River. So far the zone has attracted 42 foreign banks and non-bank financial institutions as well as over 130 company headquarters and financial intermediary enterprises. It has become the sample zone of international finance and modern service trade, as well as the regional finance, trade and information center of Northeast China.

Shenyang Economic & Technological Development Zone
The zone area was original part of the suburban Yuhong District, and was annexed out to establish a special development zone in June 1988, made a national development zone in April 1993, and merged into the Tiexi District in June 2002.

The SETDZ's GDP grew 19.51% annually and reached 83.65 billion yuan in 2010, accounting for nearly 16.7% of Shenyang's total GDP.  The export value increased 1.98% to US$1.6 billion, while the utilized FDI rose 1.73% to US$924 million.  Its major industries are equipment manufacturing, automobiles, auto parts, chemicals and pharmaceuticals.  Equipment manufacturing is the strongest industry in the ETDZ, as Shenyang is a traditional industrial base of equipment manufacturing, include major companies like Northern Heavy Industries Group, Shenyang North Traffic Heavy Industry Group, Shenyang Machine Tool Corp, Tebian Electric Apparatus and Shenyang Blower Works. The industry's total value added output in 2010 amounted to 118.76 billion yuan, accounting for 50% of the city's industrial GDP.  The ETDZ's chemical industry focuses on petrochemicals, chloralkali processing, fine chemicals and specialty rubber, with major investors like Shenyang Chemical Corp and BASF, as well as a planned industrial output exceeding 200 billion yuan in 2015.  Auto parts manufacturing is also a major industry with many domestic and international manufacturers like Daimler Chrysler, and the ETDZ plans to increase this number to 300 in 2013 with a total industrial output of 20 billion yuan. 

Based on the SETDZ, a new neighboring zone called Tiexi Industrial New Town was established to its south, purposed to develop modern service industry with Carrefour, Metro Group and Tesco being the major investors.  In 2006, more land was annexed from the Yuhong District to establish the Xi River Economic Zone, and all three new zones merged to become the Tiexi New District.

Shenyang High-Tech Industrial Development Zone

The Shenyang High-Tech Industrial Development Zone (or Shenyang HIDZ), was formerly the South Lake Science & Technology Development Zone in southern Heping District before being relocated to the waterfront area south of the Hun River in the then-Dongling District. It was set up by the Ministry of Science and Technology and Commission for Restructuring the Economic System of the State Council in May 1988, and became of the first five national high-tech industrial development zones in 1991.

The HIDZ's "pillar industries" are information technology, advanced manufacturing, biopharmaceuticals and materials science.  The IT industry focuses on the manufacture of integrated circuits, computer software and hardware, home appliances and telecommunications equipments, with major investors including Neusoft, LG and Tsinghua Tongfang and the total industrial output value hitting 95 billion yuan in 2013.  The advanced manufacturing industries focus on industrial automation, numerical control, digital medical equipments, automobiles and auto parts, with over 10,000 enterprises (including about 800 foreign investors) like Mitsubishi, Siasun Robot, Toshiba and GE registered in the zone by the end of Nov 2011, 34 of which are Fortune 500 enterprises.  The biopharmaceutical industry excels in genetic engineering, modernized Chinese medicine and chemical medicine, with major investors such as Xiehe Pharmaceutical and Shuangding Pharmaceutical. The materials science industry is an integrated industrial chain that covers research, design and manufacturing, including 15 enterprises collaborated with research powerhouses like Chinese Academy of Sciences Institute of Metal Research and Northeastern University's Institute of Metallurgy Technology.

References

Shenyang
Economic development in China